Negm El-Din Hassan nicknamed Negmu; (1945 – 21 November 2013) was a Sudanese footballer. He competed in the men's tournament at the 1972 Summer Olympics.

References

External links
 

Date of birth missing
1945 births
2013 deaths
People from Khartoum North
Sudanese footballers
Sudanese expatriate footballers
Sudan international footballers
Olympic footballers of Sudan
Footballers at the 1972 Summer Olympics
1970 African Cup of Nations players
1972 African Cup of Nations players
1976 African Cup of Nations players
Africa Cup of Nations-winning players
Association football defenders
Sudanese expatriate sportspeople in the United Arab Emirates
Expatriate footballers in the United Arab Emirates
Sharjah FC players